

Tamil film songs

1970s – 80s

1990s

2000s

2010–present